John Waddy (1751–1814) was an Irish stage actor and theatre manager. Originally, intended for a career in law, he was acting at Dublin's Smock Alley Theatre by 1774, combining this with appearances at Irish and English provincial theatres. From 1782 to 1796, he was a regular at the Theatre Royal, Norwich. He was then engaged by the Theatre Royal, Covent Garden in London making his debut there on 5 October 1796, under the management of Thomas Harris. He acted there and at Haymarket over the next decade and a half. He particularly specialised in playing Stage Irishman and also took over many roles when John Quick left Covent Garden. His second wife, billed as Mrs. Waddy, acted with him in London for several years. He departed from the Covent Garden company in 1810, and worked for a while at the Surrey Theatre south of the River Thames. He died in Oakingham in Berkshire on 12 April 1814.

Selected roles
 Gerald in Speed the Plough by Thomas Morton (1798)
 Lawley in The Wise Man of the East by Elizabeth Inchbald (1799)
 Daniel Dowlas in The Heir at Law by George Colman (1800)
 Falstaff in Henry IV, Part I by William Shakespeare (1801)
 Humphrey Dobbins in The Poor Gentleman by George Colman (1801)
 Father Brazil in Alfonso, King of Castile by Matthew Lewis (1802)
 Lord Fitz-Balaam in John Bull by George Colman (1803)

References

Bibliography
 Highfill, Philip H, Burnim, Kalman A. & Langhans, Edward A. A Biographical Dictionary of Actors, Actresses, Musicians, Dancers, Managers, and Other Stage Personnel in London, 1660-1800: Abaco to Belfille. SIU Press, 1978.
 Johnston, Roy. The Musical Life of Nineteenth-Century Belfast. Routledge, 2017.

18th-century Irish people
Irish male stage actors
18th-century British male actors
18th-century Irish male actors
19th-century British male actors
19th-century Irish male actors
1751 births
1814 deaths
Irish emigrants to Great Britain